Events in the year 1926 in Norway.

Incumbents
Monarch – Haakon VII

Events

May 11–14 – Roald Amundsen makes the first airship flight over the North Pole. The Norge leaves Spitsbergen and arrives in Teller, Alaska three days later.
September – Abraham Berge, as the only Norwegian Prime Minister ever is impeached. The charge was withholding information relating to the government rescue of a bank threatened by bankruptcy. He was, however, acquitted in 1927, along with the six ministers who stood trial alongside him.
26 September – Ullevaal Stadion opens.
Aasa Helgesen becomes the first female mayor in Norway.

Popular culture

Sports

 Ivar Ballangrud was Men's All-round Champion.

Music

Film

Literature

Notable births

1 January – Rolf Fjeldvær, politician (died 2017)
5 January – Harald Maartmann, cross-country skier (died 2021).
18 February – Alf Næsheim, illustrator (died 2014)
25 February – Eva Bergh, actress (died 2013)
1 March – Erik Bye, journalist, artist and radio and television personality (died 2004)
1 March – Per Stavem, shot putter and discus thrower (died 2006)
2 March – Christian Erlandsen, physician and politician (died 2016)
15 March – Lauritz Bernhard Sirevaag, politician (died 2016)
16 March – Else Granheim, librarian and civil servant (died 1999)
2 April – Kolbjørn Hauge, writer (died 2007).
11 April – Joralf Gjerstad, self-proclaimed healer
22 April – Finn Gustavsen, politician (died 2005)
3 May – Jorunn Kirkenær, ballet dancer and choreographer
7 May – Arne Skarpsno, philanthropist (died 2008)
10 May – Ola O. Røssum, politician (died 2012)
19 May – Arne Christiansen, judge (died 2012)
20 May – Jens Marcussen, politician (died 2007)
10 June – Arnold Eidslott, poet (died 2018)
10 June – Knut T. Giæver, publisher (died 2015).
18 June – Sverre Stenersen, Nordic combined skier, Olympic gold medallist and World Champion (died 2005)
29 June – Karl Sverre Klevstad, politician
8 July – Harald Kråkenes, rower and Olympic bronze medallist (died 2004)
15 July – Otto Lyng, politician (died 2003)
18 July – Ernst Larsen, steeplechase athlete and Olympic bronze medallist (died 2015)
8 August – Gunnar Aksnes, chemist (died 2010)
16 August – Eivind Hjelmtveit, cultural administrator (died 2017)
17 August – Hakon Barfod, sailor and double Olympic gold medallist (died 2013)
23 August – Borghild Røyseland, politician (died 2020).
27 August – Kristen Nygaard, mathematician, computer programming language pioneer and politician (died 2002)
6 September – Ola Thorleif Ruud, politician (died 2018)
6 September – Kirsten Sørlie, actress and stage director (died 2013)
19 October – Arne Bendiksen, singer, composer and producer (died 2009)
23 October – Kåre Dæhlen, diplomat (died 2020)
30 October – Hans Torgersen, politician (died 2015)
20 November – Asbjørn Haugstvedt, politician (died 2008)
21 November – Odd Børretzen, author, illustrator, translator and vocalist (died 2012)
24 November – Toralv Maurstad, actor and theatre director (died 2022)
6 December – Marie Takvam, author and actor (died 2008)
14 December – Kristian Halse, politician (died 2018)
20 December – Tor Brustad, biophysicist. (died 2016)

Full date unknown
Anfinn Lund, civil servant and politician (died 2001)
Sigmund Mjelve, writer (died 1995)
Christian Norberg-Schulz, architect, architectural historian and theorist (died 2000)
Arne Rettedal, politician and Minister (died 2001)
Hans Skjervheim, philosopher (died 1999)

Notable deaths

1 April – Harald Bjerke, businessperson (born 1860)
23 May – Peter W. K. Bøckman, Sr., bishop and theologian (born 1851)
8 August – Jens Zetlitz Monrad Kielland, architect (born 1866)
9 September – Anton Jörgen Andersen, composer (born 1845)
18 November – Peter Harboe Castberg, banker (born 1844)
24 December – Johan Castberg, jurist and politician (born 1861)

Full date unknown
Torger Holtsmark, farmer and politician (born 1863)
Peter Olrog Schjøtt, philologist and politician (born 1833)

See also

References

External links